Seseria is an Indomalayan genus of spread-winged skippers in the family Hesperiidae.

Species
Seseria affinis   (Druce, 1873)  Sumatra, Malaya, Borneo, Java
Seseria dohertyi   Watson, 1893  Northwest Himalayas, Nepal, Sikkim, Assam, Hainan,  Laos, Laos, Vietnam
Seseria formosana   (Fruhstorfer, 1909)  Formosa
Seseria sambara  Moore, [1866]   Assam to  Indo-China Northwest India to Burma, Laos, Vietnam
Seseria strigata   Evans, 1926  Burma, Thailand, Laos
Seseria sesame    Evans, 1949  Borneo

References

Natural History Museum Lepidoptera genus database

Tagiadini
Hesperiidae genera
Taxa named by Shōnen Matsumura